The First Secretary of the Buryat regional branch of the Communist Party of the Soviet Union was the position of highest authority in the Buryat ASSR (until July 7, 1958 Buryat–Mongol ASSR) in the Russian SFSR of the Soviet Union. The position was created in August 1923, and abolished in August 1991. The First Secretary was a de facto appointed position usually by the Politburo or the General Secretary himself.

List of First Secretaries of the Communist Party of Buryatia

See also
Buryat Autonomous Soviet Socialist Republic

Notes

Sources
 World Statesmen.org

Regional Committees of the Communist Party of the Soviet Union
Politics of Buryatia
1923 establishments in the Soviet Union
1991 disestablishments in the Soviet Union